Alizé Cornet and Yaroslava Shvedova were the defending champions, but chose not to participate.

Chan Hao-ching and Chan Yung-jan won the title, defeating Naomi Broady and Heather Watson in the final, 6–3, 6–1.

Seeds

Draw

References 
 Draw

Hong Kong Tennis Open - Doubles
Hong Kong Open (tennis)
Hong Kong Tennis Open - Doubles